Târgușor is a commune in Constanța County, Northern Dobruja, Romania.

The commune includes two villages:
 Târgușor (historical name: Pazarlia)
 Mireasa (historical names: Cheia; Ghelengic)

Demographics
At the 2011 census, Târguşor had 1,564 Romanians (99.68%), 5 others (0.32%).

References

Communes in Constanța County
Localities in Northern Dobruja